Oscar Karl Niclas Hiljemark (born 28 June 1992) is a Swedish professional football coach and a former midfielder. He is the manager of the Danish club AaB. Starting off his career with IF Elfsborg in 2010, he went on to represent PSV, Palermo, Genoa, Panathinaikos, and Dynamo Moscow before retiring at AaB in 2021. A full international between 2012 and 2020, he won 28 caps for the Sweden national team and represented his country at UEFA Euro 2016 and the 2018 FIFA World Cup.

Club career

Early career
Hiljemark played for Swedish top team IF Elfsborg. He was chased by many clubs in Sweden in his youth but decided to sign a youth contract with Elfsborg in 2008. He participated in many national team camps as a young player, and was predicted a great career for his mature style of play.

IF Elfsborg

Two years after signing with Elfsborg, at the age of 18, he earned a place in the senior team after playing in the Elfsborg and Sweden national youth teams. During his first year in the Elfsborg senior team he played 4 games in Allsvenskan and 2 games in the Europa League qualifications. He played 30 minutes in the Europa League play-off match against Napoli. The game ended with a 2–0 loss for Elfsborg after two goals from Edinson Cavani.

He made his first team debut in Elfsborg's 2–2 draw away at IF Brommapojkarna on 26 September 2010, and scored his first goal against Syrianska FC in a 2–1 home victory on 27 June 2011.

At the age of 18 in his debut season 2011, he was nominated as newcomer of the year, being the youngest of the nominated. He also won the prestigious Månadens Tipselitspelare prize with the jury's citation: "Oscar Hiljemark has been endowed with a massive winning attitude that he has used to the competitive environment for the optimum development. He is a talented player who works hard and takes a mature responsibility from his midfield position." Players who also won the prize are Freddie Ljungberg, Johan Elmander, Olof Mellberg and Kim Källström.

After a successful 2011 season, Hiljemark was scouted and chased by clubs such as Genoa and Club Brugge, but Elfsborg ignored the bids, as they want him for a few more seasons.

PSV Eindhoven

On 4 January 2013, Hiljemark signed with PSV until 2017, for €2.2 million. He made his Eredivisie debut on 26 January 2013 in a 5–1 away victory against Heracles Almelo, replacing Tim Matavž. He scored his first goal on 17 August 2013 in a convincing 3–0 victory against Go Ahead Eagles. With the likes of Memphis Depay and Georginio Wijnaldum in the midfield, however, Hiljemark struggled to find consistent minutes. Injuries also prevented him from establishing any sort of rhythm. Despite 49 league appearances for PSV, mostly as a late substitute, Hiljemark managed just 2 league goals in 2 years for his club.

Palermo
After winning the 2015 U21 European Championship, several teams were interested in the Swedish midfielder. He moved to Italian team Palermo for €2 million (plus €500,000 in add-ons), signing a four-year contract. In Rosanero, he joined U21 teammate Robin Quaison. He recorded his first Serie A goal on 13 September 2015 against Carpi, a game that ended in a 2–2 draw. Six days later, he scored a brace against Milan, tying the game twice before a 2–3 loss. Hiljemark's brilliant start to the season attracted the attention of bigger clubs. He was linked with Italian giants Milan and Napoli for a possible transfer, as well as Premier League teams Norwich City, Southampton, Watford and West Ham. Towards the end of the 2015–16 Serie A season, Palermo looked to be in danger of being relegated. In the last game of the season, Hiljemark provided a crucial assist for Franco Vázquez in a 3–2 victory against Verona to clinch a spot for Palermo in the 2016–17 Serie A season. Hiljemark played in all 38 matches of Palermo in that season.

Genoa 
On 26 January 2017, Palermo have officially announced that Oscar Hiljemark has joined Genoa, on loan with an obligation to buy. The Grifone have been trying to reinforce their midfield, and it emerged that they were close to the Swedish midfielder.

Loan to Panathinaikos
On 31 August 2017, Genoa midfielder Oscar Hiljemark arrived in Athens to complete his loan move to Panathinaikos, with the latter retaining the option to purchase the player at the end of the 2017–18 season. On 30 September 2017, he scored his first goal with the club in a 2–0 home Super League win game against PAS Giannina.

On 30 January 2018, Hiljemark's loan spell from Genoa was terminated by mutual consent, mainly because of the player's unwillingness to continue under the club's financial decline and interruption of funding.

Loan to Dynamo Moscow
On 1 September 2019, Hiljemark joined Russian club FC Dynamo Moscow on loan for the 2019–20 season.

AaB and retirement
On 5 October 2020, Hiljemark signed a deal until June 2023 with Danish Superliga club AaB. On 16 June 2021, at the age of only 28, he announced his retirement after prolonged problems with injuries, particularly a recurring hip injury. AaB announced that Hiljemark will work as an assistant coach instead on a contract until 30 June 2024.

International career

Youth

Hiljemark made his debut for Sweden U21 on 9 February 2011 in a 1–3 loss against Portugal U21. He captained Sweden U21 throughout their successful 2015 U21 European Championship campaign, in Czech Republic.

Senior
Hiljemark was selected for the annual training camp for the Sweden national team in January 2012. He made his debut for Sweden in a friendly against Bahrain on 18 January 2012, scoring his first goal for his country. Due to his involvement with the U-21 squad, Hiljemark was not regularly selected for the senior team until after the 2015 U21 European Championship. He received his first big call-up to the senior side in November 2015 against Denmark for the UEFA Euro 2016 qualifying play-offs. He came on in the 81st minute of the second leg for Sebastian Larsson. Hiljemark then was announced to be one of the 23 players called up for Euro 2016 campaign.

In May 2018 he was named in Sweden's 23 man squad for the 2018 FIFA World Cup in Russia, and played in the group stage games against South Korea and Mexico.

Career statistics

Club

International
Appearances and goals by national team and year

International goals

Honours
Elfsborg
 Allsvenskan: 2012
PSV
 Eredivisie: 2014–15
Sweden U21
UEFA European Under-21 Championship: 2015
Records
 Most caps for the Swedish Under-21 team: 37

References

External links

Oscar Hiljemark at Voetbal International 

1992 births
Living people
Swedish footballers
Swedish expatriate footballers
Sweden youth international footballers
Sweden under-21 international footballers
Sweden international footballers
Association football defenders
IF Elfsborg players
PSV Eindhoven players
Palermo F.C. players
Genoa C.F.C. players
Panathinaikos F.C. players
FC Dynamo Moscow players
AaB Fodbold players
Allsvenskan players
Eredivisie players
Serie A players
Super League Greece players
Russian Premier League players
Danish Superliga players
UEFA Euro 2016 players
2018 FIFA World Cup players
People from Gislaved Municipality
Expatriate footballers in the Netherlands
Expatriate footballers in Italy
Expatriate footballers in Greece
Expatriate footballers in Russia
Expatriate men's footballers in Denmark
Swedish expatriate sportspeople in the Netherlands
Swedish expatriate sportspeople in Italy
Swedish expatriate sportspeople in Greece
Swedish expatriate sportspeople in Russia
Swedish expatriate sportspeople in Denmark
AaB Fodbold managers
Danish Superliga managers
Sportspeople from Jönköping County